William Rede (c. 1500 – 3 November 1558) was the member of Parliament for Cricklade in the parliament of 1529 and for Gloucestershire in November 1554.

References 

Members of the Parliament of England for Gloucestershire
Members of the Parliament of England (pre-1707) for Cricklade
Year of birth uncertain
1558 deaths
English MPs 1529–1536
English MPs 1554–1555